Mario Karlovic is an Australian footballer who plays for Kuala Lumpur FA in the Malaysia Premier League. Karlovic plays as a creative attacking midfielder but can also play as a defensive midfielder. He is known for his free kicks and creative play.

Club career 
Karlovic commenced his football career at Adelaide City Force signing for the NSL club as a 15-year-old in 2000. During his time at the club he represented the Australian Joeys in the Under 17 World Cup Qualifiers.

He was sold to Serie B club A.S. Cittadella in 2002 after also receiving interest from AC Milan. Karlović was unable to fulfill an invitation from the Italian giants due to a foot injury. He has spent the majority of his football career playing in Italy. He previously played for A.S. Cittadella in Serie C1 before he signed for Serie A side Torino FC after interest from Internazionale and Sampdoria. At Torino he was immediately loaned out to Swiss club FC Chiasso who were coached by Attilio Lombardo. Upon his return from his loan spell at FC Chiasso, he encountered passport issues and signed for Serie D club AS Viterbese.

On 24 September 2009 it was confirmed by Brisbane Roar manager Frank Farina that Karlovic would play for the Brisbane-based club on a short-term contract to cover the loss of Massimo Murdocca to injury.

Karlović signed for Minangkabau FC in December 2010 in the Liga Primer Indonesia where he helped the club to a mid table finish scoring 3 goals from a defensive midfield position in 18 games. His performances caught the attention of champions Persebaya 1927 whom he signed for in August 2011. He joined Terengganu FA of the Malaysia Super League for the 2014 season but left them at the end of the season as the management did not extend his one-year contract. He moved on to ATM FA in 2015 before joinining Kuala Lumpur FA in 2016.

References

External links
 Oz Football profile

Brisbane Roar FC players
1984 births
Living people
Australian soccer players
Expatriate footballers in Indonesia
A.S. Cittadella players
A-League Men players
Terengganu FC players
Expatriate footballers in Malaysia
Australian people of Croatian descent
Association football midfielders